Zeehan railway station in Tasmania, was a major junction and railway yard for numerous different railway and tramway systems in western Tasmania in the town of Zeehan.

Its peak of operations was between the 1890s and the late 1920s – reflecting the general fate of the town and the industries that were located in the Zeehan and surrounding districts.

Terminus
It was the terminus of the Strahan–Zeehan Railway from the south, the Emu Bay Railway from the north  and a number of narrow gauge tram systems that utilised the railway yard and radiated out in all directions from the station.

The narrow gauge North East Dundas Tramway line proceeded separately out of the station and yard following the Emu Bay railway alignment, before it turned toward its easterly route.

Yard

The government railway that linked the Mount Lyell railway to the Emu Bay, and then to Burnie was an important part of the government railway system.  The government looked to improve the facilities over time while the railways were carrying optimum freight loads.

 In 1913 the railway workshops were moved from West Strahan to Zeehan and the yard, over half a mile long, with two gauges and many sidings, was one of the biggest in the state

The Zeehan railway station yard was extensive with numerable small tram lines connecting with the yard in the peak of the activity at the station from before the First World War until the beginning of the depression – when most smaller tramways and mines and smelter operations had ceased to operate.

A map by C.C. Singleton of the Australian Railway Historical Society in Bulletin 289 November 1961, and in Bulletin 312, October 1963 offer an understanding of the yard layout:

Operators
Zeehan Tramway Company
N.E.Dundas Tramway
Government railway to Strahan
Emu Bay Railway Company

Facilities
Passenger station
Goods shed
Emu Bay Railway engine shed
Workshops shed
Carriage shed
Engine shed
Zeehan Tramway sheds

Tramways

Tramways mentioned here specifically utilised the Zeehan railway station as their terminus.
 Comstock Tram
 Dunkleys Tram
 Federation Tram
 Florence Tram
 Grubb's Tramway
 Howards Tram
 New Dundas Tramway commenced in 1891, absorbed into the Mariposa Tramway, and later again into Howard's tramway system
 Mariposa Tramway
 North East Dundas Tramway was a 2' line leaving Zeehan to the Mount Read area.
 Oonah Tram
 Zeehan Tramway Company - constructed in the 1890s, taken over by the Dunkley Brothers in 1918.

Accidents 
A spectacular boiler explosion occurred at 7.15 am on 17 May 1899 in the Zeehan railway station yard.  The North-East Dundas tram approached the Wilson Street waiting room at the end of the station yard, the engine exploded. The fireman Thomas  Marra was killed instantly and the driver David Biddulph died soon after.

Decline
In 1905 Zeehan Tramway Company ceased daily passenger service
In 1926 Dundas line regular services traffic ceased and line pulled up in 1940.
In 1929 NE Dundas and Comstock lines traffic ceased and all line up by 1943.
In 1948 the last year of heavy traffic between Rosebery and Zeehan
In 1960 the Emu Bay Railway passenger service ceased in February
In 1960 the Strahan-Zeehan Railway line closed in June.
On 14 August 1965 the Emu Bay Railway goods services ceased.

Post closure status 
In 1971 Frank Stamford of The Light Railway Research Society of Australia wrote in Light Railways:
 A visit on 12th April 1971 showed that the station building has gone, and most of the track has been rather half-heartedly removed. A length of 2 ft gauge track can still be found near where the station building used to be.  The various engine sheds and carriage sheds remain, and are still being used by local timber millers, transport contractors, etc.

See also
Railways on the West Coast of Tasmania

Notes

References
 
 
 

Disused railway stations in Tasmania
Railway stations in Western Tasmania
Zeehan
Emu Bay Railway